The Amiri Diwan of the State of Qatar is the sovereign body and the administrative office of the Amir. It is the official workplace and office of the Amir of the State of Qatar. The Amiri Diwan represents the figurative and bureaucratic center of Qatar. The building also hosts the office of the Deputy Amir and the Prime Minister.

History
The site that is currently the Amiri Diwan was previously Al Bidda Fort, built in the 18th century. It was later designated as a military fort called Qal'at Al-Askar during the Ottoman period in Qatar. After the Ottomans withdrew from Qatar, the building became the official office of Qatar's Rulers, and was renamed Doha Palace, also sometimes being known as Qal'at Al-Shouyoukh (Palace of the Sheikhs). The fort was officially renamed to Amiri Diwan in 1971 after Qatar gained its independence from the United Kingdom and the title Amir replaced the title Ruler of the State of Qatar.

Activities
Among the duties of the Amiri Diwan are:
Updating the Amir of Qatar on the latest international and domestic developments;
Presenting draft laws to the Amir for approval;
Relaying instructions from the Amir to other governmental bodies.
Control the administration in the state

See also
Old Amiri Palace, Doha

References

Royal residences
Buildings and structures in Doha